"The Chemical Basis of Morphogenesis" is an article that the English mathematician Alan Turing wrote in 1952. It describes how patterns in nature, such as stripes and spirals, can arise naturally from a homogeneous, uniform state. The theory, which can be called a reaction–diffusion theory of morphogenesis, has become a basic model in theoretical biology. Such patterns have come to be known as Turing patterns. For example, it has been postulated that the protein VEGFC can form Turing patterns to govern the formation of lymphatic vessels in the zebrafish embryo.

Reaction–diffusion systems

Reaction–diffusion systems have attracted much interest as a prototype model for pattern formation. Patterns such as fronts, spirals, targets, hexagons, stripes and dissipative solitons are found in various types of reaction-diffusion systems in spite of large discrepancies e.g. in the local reaction terms. Such patterns have been dubbed "Turing patterns".

Reaction–diffusion processes form one class of explanation for the embryonic development of animal coats and skin pigmentation. Another reason for the interest in reaction-diffusion systems is that although they represent nonlinear partial differential equations, there are often possibilities for an analytical treatment.

See also
 Evolutionary developmental biology
 Turing pattern
 Symmetry breaking

References

1952 in England
1952 documents
Mathematical modeling
Parabolic partial differential equations
Biological processes
Chaos theory
Works by English people
Alan Turing
Mathematics papers